My Korean Jagiya is a 2017 Philippine television drama comedy romance series directed by Mark A. Reyes, starring Heart Evangelista and Alexander Lee. The series premiered on GMA Network's GMA Telebabad primetime block and aired worldwide on GMA Pinoy TV on August 21, 2017, replacing I Heart Davao.

NUTAM (Nationwide Urban Television Audience Measurement) People in television homes ratings are provided by AGB Nielsen Philippines.

Series overview

Episodes
In the tables below, the   represent the lowest ratings and the  represent the highest ratings.

August 2017

September 2017

October 2017

November 2017

December 2017

January 2018

References

Lists of Philippine drama television series episodes